Wantuck may refer to:
USS Wantuck (APD-125), a United States Navy high-speed transport in commission from 1944 to 1957

People with the surname
John Joseph Wantuck (1923-1943), United States Marine private and posthumous recipient of the Navy Cross for his actions on New Georgia in July 1943